The Tagus (see below) is the longest river in the Iberian Peninsula. The river rises in the Montes Universales near Teruel, in mid-eastern Spain, flows , generally west with two main south-westward sections, to empty into the Atlantic Ocean in Lisbon. Its drainage basin covers  – exceeded in the peninsula only by the Douro. The river is highly used. Several dams and diversions supply drinking water to key population centres of central Spain and Portugal; dozens of hydroelectric stations create power. Between dams it follows a very constricted course, but after Almourol, Portugal it has a wide alluvial valley, prone to flooding. Its mouth is a large estuary culminating at the major port, and Portuguese capital, Lisbon.

The source is specifically: in political geography, at the Fuente de García in the Frías de Albarracín municipality; in physical geography, within the notably high range, the Sistema Ibérico (Iberian System), of the Sierra de Albarracín Comarca. The most plentiful tributaries (originating in the Central System mountain range) are right bank, which is locally to the north.

The main cities the rivers passes through consecutively are Aranjuez, Toledo and Talavera de la Reina in Spain, and Abrantes, Santarém, Almada and Lisbon in Portugal. The Spanish capital, Madrid, lies on the right-bank side of the Tagus basin.

Course

In Spain

The first notable city on the Tagus is Sacedón. Below Aranjuez it receives the combined flow of the Jarama, Henares, Algodor and Tajuña.  Below Toledo it receives the Guadarrama River.  Above Talavera de la Reina it receives the Alberche.  At Valdeverdeja is the upper end of the long upper reservoir, the Embalse de Valdecañas, beyond which are the Embalse de Torrejon, into which flow the Tiétar, and the lower reservoir, the Alcántara Dam into which flows the Alagón at the lower end.

A canal and aqueduct are between the Tagus and the Segura for the Tagus-Segura Water Transfer.

In Portugal
After forming the border it enters Portugal, passing Vila Velha de Ródão, Abrantes, Constância, Entroncamento, Santarém and Vila Franca de Xira at the head of the long narrow estuary, which has Lisbon at its mouth. The estuary is protected by the Tagus Estuary Natural Reserve. Two bridges span the river at Lisbon: the Vasco da Gama Bridge – the second longest bridge in Europe, with a total length of  – and the 25 de Abril Bridge. The Port of Lisbon, straddling its mouth, is one of Europe's busiest.

The Portuguese Alentejo region and the former Ribatejo Province take their names from the river: Alentejo, from além Tejo ("beyond the Tejo") and Ribatejo probably from arriba Tejo (an archaic phrase for "upper Tejo"). However, the Spanish word  means "riverside", or "riviera", implying that Ribatejo can also mean very generically "the side of Tejo". Many instances of towns in Spain have this prefix.

Name
The river's Latin name is Tagus. While the etymology is unclear, the most probable etymological origin for the hydronym Tagus is Indo-European *(s)tag- ('to drip').

Geology
The lower Tagus region in Portugal is a seismically active area. Major earthquakes in the Lower Tagus include those of 1309, 1531, and 1909.

History

The Pepper Wreck, properly the wreck of the Nossa Senhora dos Mártires, is a shipwreck located and excavated at the mouth of the Tagus between 1996 and 2001.

The river had strategic value to the Spanish and Portuguese empires, as it guarded the approach to Lisbon.

In popular culture
A major river, the Tagus is brought to mind in the songs and stories of the Portuguese. A popular fado song in Lisbon notes that, while people get older, the Tagus remains young (“My hair getting white, the Tagus is always young”). The author, Fernando Pessoa, wrote a poem that begins: 
The Tagus is more beautiful than the river that flows through my village. But the Tagus is not more beautiful than the river that flows through my village...

Richard Crashaw (died 1649) wrote a poem "Saint Mary Magdalene, or the Weeper". This refers to the "Golden" Tagus as wanting Mary Magdalene's silver tears. In classical poetry, the Tagus was famous for its gold-bearing sands (the catalogued works of: Catullus 29.19; Ovid's Amores 1.15.34; Juvenal's Satires 3.55; and others).

See also
List of rivers of Spain
List of rivers of Portugal

References

 
Rivers of Spain
Rivers of Portugal
International rivers of Europe
Rivers of Castilla–La Mancha
Rivers of Extremadura
Rivers of the Community of Madrid
Geography of Lisbon
Belém (Lisbon)
Portugal–Spain border